Mortroux is a commune in the Creuse department in the Nouvelle-Aquitaine region of central France.

Geography

Population

Sights
 The church, dating from the twelfth century.
 A seventeenth-century lime-tree, the "Sully", named after a Prime Minister under the reign of Henri IV.
 Pottery finials above windows on a couple of houses.

See also
Communes of the Creuse department

References

Communes of Creuse